William Ambrose Jones  (July 21, 1865 – February 17, 1921) was a bishop of the Catholic Church born in the United States. He served as Bishop of Puerto Rico from 1907 to 1921.

Biography
Born in Cambridge, New York, William Jones was ordained a priest for the Augustinian order on March 15, 1890. On January 12, 1907, Pope Pius X appointed him as the Bishop of Puerto Rico. He was consecrated a bishop by Archbishop Giuseppe Aversa, the Apostolic Delegate to Cuba, on February 24, 1907. The principal co-consecrators were Bishops Pedro Ladislao González y Estrada of San Cristóbal de la Habana and Antonio Aurelio Torres y Sanz of Cienfuegos. He arrived in Puerto Rico on March 16, 1907.

Jones continued to serve as the diocesan bishop until his death on February 17, 1921, at the age of 55. His remains were transferred to San Juan Cathedral, in Puerto Rico.

References

External links

 (for Chronology of Bishops) 
 (for Chronology of Bishops) 

1865 births
1921 deaths
Augustinian bishops
American Roman Catholic missionaries
Burials at the Cathedral of San Juan Bautista, Puerto Rico
Catholics from New York (state)
Roman Catholic missionaries in Puerto Rico
People from Cambridge, New York
20th-century Roman Catholic bishops in Puerto Rico
Roman Catholic bishops of Puerto Rico